Leptocleidus is an extinct genus of plesiosaur, belonging to the family Leptocleididae.

Discovery

 
In short, the term Leptocleidus means "slender clavicle". It comes from a merge of the Greek words λεπτοσ, meaning "slender" and κλειδ (also spelled κλεισ) meaning clavicle.

Leptocleidus is known from the following sediments:
L. capensis is known from the Sundays River Formation (upper Valanginian age), Cape Province, South Africa.
L. clemai found near Kalbarri in the Carnarvon Basin (Hauterivian-Barremian age) Western Australia.
L. superstes is known from the Upper Weald Clay (Barremian age), Sussex, England.

A specimen from the Vectis Formation (lower Aptian age), Isle of Wight, found in 1995 and seen as a "Leptocleidus sp.", was named as a separate genus Vectocleidus in 2012.

Description
With large clavicles and interclavicle and small scapulae, Leptocleidus resembled the Early Jurassic Rhomaleosaurus and members of the Cretaceous family, Polycotylidae. The animal had 21 teeth on either side of its maxilla and approximately 35 teeth on each side of the mandible. The Leptocleidus triangle-shaped skull had a crest running from a ridge on the end of the nose to the nasal region. Differing from pliosaurids, Leptocleidus had single-headed cervical ribs and a deep depression in the centra of the neck vertebrae.

Leptocleidus, unlike many plesiosaurs, lived in shallow lagoons and likely visited brackish and fresh water systems (such as the mouths of large rivers). This led Arthur Richard Ivor Cruickshank to infer that this movement to fresh water was an attempt to flee larger plesiosaurs and pliosaurs. Most species are known from The British Isles but  L. capensis''''' was discovered in Cape Province, South Africa.

Classification

Cladogram based on Ketchum and Benson (2011):

See also

 List of plesiosaur genera
 Timeline of plesiosaur research

References

Further reading

External links
Leptocleidus on DinoWight
http://plesiosauria.com/leptocleidus
https://web.archive.org/web/20070922021505/http://www.palaeos.com/Vertebrates/Units/220Lepidosauromorpha/220.520.html#Leptocleidus
https://web.archive.org/web/20070922061721/http://www.plesiosaur.com/database/genusIndividual.php?i=73

Plesiosaurs
Early Cretaceous plesiosaurs of Europe
Early Cretaceous plesiosaurs
Fossil taxa described in 1922
Early Cretaceous reptiles of Australia
Plesiosaurs of Oceania
Plesiosaurs of Africa
Taxa named by Charles William Andrews
Sauropterygian genera